Timo Näveri (born 6 July 1956) is a Finnish sports shooter. He competed in two events at the 1992 Summer Olympics.

References

External links
 

1956 births
Living people
Finnish male sport shooters
Olympic shooters of Finland
Shooters at the 1992 Summer Olympics
People from Sodankylä
Sportspeople from Lapland (Finland)